John Jones McRae (January 10, 1815May 31, 1868) was an American politician in Mississippi. A Democrat, he served in the Mississippi House of Representatives, the U.S. Senate, and as governor of Mississippi.

Biography
McRae was born in Sneedsboro, North Carolina.  In 1817, he moved with his parents to Winchester, Mississippi.

He served in the Mississippi House of Representatives from 1847 to 1851. During that time, he helped set up the University of Mississippi. He also represented Mississippi in the United States Senate in 1851 and 1852, in the U.S. Congress in the 35th and 36th congresses, and in the Confederate Congress during the American Civil War. He also served as the 21st Governor of Mississippi from 1854 to 1857.

He died on a visit to British Honduras (now Belize), where his brother Colin J. McRae lived in exile.

References

|-

1815 births
1868 deaths
Democratic Party governors of Mississippi
Members of the Confederate House of Representatives from Mississippi
Speakers of the Mississippi House of Representatives
Democratic Party United States senators from Mississippi
People of Mississippi in the American Civil War
People from Anson County, North Carolina
Democratic Party members of the United States House of Representatives from Mississippi
19th-century American politicians
Miami University alumni